Acalolepta sericeomicans is a species of beetle in the family Cerambycidae. It was described by Léon Fairmaire in 1889. It is known from China.

References

Acalolepta
Beetles described in 1889